Angolan Portuguese is a group of dialects and accents of the Portuguese language used mostly in Angola, where it is an official language. In 2005 it was used there by 60% of the population, including by 20% as their first language. The 2016 CIA World Fact Book reports that 12.3 million, or 47% of the population, speaks Portuguese as their first language.
However, many parents raise their children to speak only Portuguese. The 2014 census found that 71% speak Portuguese at home, many of them alongside a Bantu language, breaking down to 85% in urban areas and 49% in rural areas.

There are different stages of Portuguese in Angola in a similar manner to other Portuguese-speaking African countries. Some closely approximate Standard Portuguese pronunciation and are associated with the upper class and younger generations of urban background. Angola is the country with the second-highest number of Portuguese speakers, behind only Brazil.

Phonology 
The standard phonology in Angola is based on the European standard, as in the rest of Lusophone Africa. Vernacular accents share similarities with Brazilian Portuguese and these similar features have historical reasons. However, the contemporary Standard European Portuguese is the preferred pronunciation, as such it has become a transitional dialect somewhat midway between the European and Brazilian varieties.

Vowels 

 The close central vowel  occurs only at final, unstressed syllables, e.g. presidente .
The nasal  becomes open .

Consonants 

Word-final  is dropped, especially by people who speak Portuguese as their second language.

Lexicon 

Although most of the vocabulary is the same as in Portugal, Brazil or Mozambique, there are differences, many due to the influence of African languages spoken in Angola. In the capital, Luanda, indigenous languages are practically nonexistent.

Examples of words borrowed from Kimbundu into Angolan Portuguese include:
  'house'
  'chicken stew'
  'basket'
 , milongo 'medicine'
  'crime'

Impact 

Many words of Angolan origin are used in other variants of Portuguese. Among these words are bunda (backside or "bottom"); fuba [fubá in Brazil] (maize flour); moleque ("kid"); kizomba and kuduro. 

Various aspects of Brazilian culture – samba, candomblé and capoeira – all bear linguistic traces of this contact. 
 
In Portugal, Angolan Portuguese has had a large influence on the vernacular of the younger population, contributing significant amounts of lexicon. Examples include:
bazar ("to go away/home")
garina ("girl")
bumbar ("to work" in Angola, "to party" in Portugal; sometimes spelt as bombar)
bué ("many", "a lot")
iá ("yes")

Many of these words and expression made their way to Portugal through immigration of black Angolans as a result of the Angolan civil war.

See also 
 Portuguese language in Africa
 São Tomean Portuguese
 Kimbundu
 Cape Verdean Portuguese
 Televisão Pública de Angola

References

Bibliography

External links 
Cátedra "Português Língua Segunda e Estrangeira" — Bibliografia sobre o Português de Angola . Cátedra de Português Língua Segunda e Estrangeira. — Bibliography on Angolan Portuguese
O Português na África — Angola . www.linguaportuguesa.ufrn.br
Queta, Clemêncio. Alguns aspectos da língua portuguesa em Angola . Jornal de Angola.

Portuguese dialects
Languages of Angola
Portuguese language in Africa